The Alvars were the Tamil poet-saints of South India who espoused bhakti (devotion) to the Hindu preserver deity Vishnu, in their songs of longing, ecstasy, and service. They are venerated in Vaishnavism, which regards Vishnu as the Ultimate Reality.

Many modern academics place the lifetime of the Alvars between the 5th century and 9th century CE. Orthodoxy posits the number of Alvars as ten, though there are other references that include Andal and Madhurakavi Alvar, making the number 12. Andal is the only female Alvar among the 12. Together with the contemporary 63 Shaivite Nayanars, they are among the most important saints from Tamil Nadu.

The devotional outpourings of the Alvars, composed during the early medieval period of Tamil history, were the catalysts behind the Bhakti Movement through their hymns of worship to Vishnu and his avatars. They praised the Divya Desams, the 108 divine realms of deities affiliated to Vaishnavism. The poetry of the Alvars echoes bhakti to God through love, and in the ecstasy of such devotions they sang hundreds of songs which embodied both depth of feeling and the felicity of expressions. The collection of their hymns is known as the Naalayira Divya Prabandham. The bhakti literature that sprang from Alvars has contributed to the establishment and sustenance of a culture that deviated from the Vedic religion and rooted itself in devotion as the only path for salvation. In addition, they contributed to Tamil devotional verses independent of a knowledge of Sanskrit. As a part of the legacy of the Alvars, five Vaishnavite philosophical traditions (sampradayas) developed over a period of time.

Etymology

The word Alvar has traditionally been etymologized as from Tamil. Al (ஆழ்), 'to immerse oneself' as 'one who dives deep into the ocean of the countless attributes of god'.

The Indologist Sudalaimuthu Palaniappan has established from epigraphy and textual evidence that the traditional term Āḻvār (ஆழ்வார்) for Vaiṣṇavaite Tamil poet saints has historically been a corruption of the original Āḷvār (ஆள்வார்).

Correction of the original Āḷvār (ஆள்வார்) to Āḻvār (ஆழ்வார்) 
Palaniappan shows that what was originally Āḷvār (ஆள்வார்) meaning 'One who rules', or '(Spiritual) Master' got changed through hypercorrection and folk etymology to Āḻvār (ஆழ்வார்) meaning 'One who is immersed'. Palaniappan cites inscriptional evidence and even literary evidence from Vaishnavaite tradition itself for a gradual sound change from Āḷvār (ஆள்வார்) to Āḻvār (ஆழ்வார்) over a period of two centuries from the 9th to the 11th century involving references to religious leaders in Vaiṣṇavism, Śaivism and even Jainism and to political personalities. He states: "āḻvār is but a corrupt form of āḷvār which has been used interchangeably with nāyanār in secular and religious contexts in the Tamil land" and "... Notwithstanding the Vaiṣṇava claim of unbroken teacher-student tradition, the fact that Nāthamuni has used the form āļvār but Piļļān, a disciple and younger cousin of Rāmānuja, ended up using the form āḻvār suggests that there has been an error in transmission somewhere along the teacher-student chain between the two teachers. This error was obviously due to the influence of the sound variation that has occurred in the Srirangam area and elsewhere".

The original word ஆள்வார் compares with the epithet 'Āṇḍãḷ' (ஆண்டாள்) for the female canonized Vaishnava saint Gōdai (கோதை) and they share the same verb Tamil. āḷ (ஆள், to rule), the former being the honorific non-past (or present-future) form and the latter the feminine past form of that same verb.

Reception by scholars 
Palaniappan's findings on 'Āḻvār' have been accepted by scholars like Prof. Alexander Dubyanskiy. In his article on Āṇṭāḷ, Dubyanskiy says, "Āṇṭāḷ was among the twelve Āḻvārs, the poet-saints, adepts of Viṣṇu, canonized by the tradition, which accepted the interpretation of meaning of the word āḻvār as "submerged, plunged [in love for god]", from the verbal root āḻ, "to plunge, to be in the deep". But recently it was convincingly shown by S. Palaniappan (2004) that initially the term in question was represented by the word āḷvār (from the verbal root āḷ "to rule"), which reads as "those who rule, lords", and was applied in the texts, both Śaiva and Vaiṣṇava, to Śiva and Viṣṇu accordingly (pp. 66–70). In the course of time the term underwent the process of sound variation, took the form āḻvār and acquired the folk etymology which was accepted and fixed by the tradition. It is worth noting here that this interpretation agrees well with the meaning of the poetess' nickname Āṇṭāḷ, which means "she who rules".

Legend 
The Alvars are considered the twelve supreme devotees of Vishnu in Sri Vaishnavism, who were instrumental in popularising Vaishnavism in the Tamil-speaking regions. The Alvars were influential in promoting the Bhagavata cult and the two Hindu epics, the Ramayana and the Mahabharata. The religious works of these saints in Tamil, and their hymns, are compiled as the Naalayira Divya Prabandham, containing 4000 verses, and the 108 temples revered in their hymns are classified as Divya Desams. The verses of the various Alvars were compiled by Nathamuni (824–924 CE), a 9th-century Vaishnavite theologian, who called it the "Dravida Veda or Tamil Veda". The songs of the Prabandam are regularly sung in various Vishnu temples of South India, daily, and also during festivals.

The legendary birth of the Alvars is traced to an event in the mid-Dvapara Yuga, due to a heated debate between Vishvakarma (the divine architect of the gods) and Agastya (a sage) about the superiority of the Sanskrit or the Tamil language. In the midst of this debate, Agastya gets furious, which makes him curse the former that at some point of time, one of his pieces of architecture would be destroyed (a contemporary to Gandhari's curse to Dvaraka) and would never be recovered. (Some sources say Agastya curses Vishvakarma for Sanskrit to lose its fame, as the curse became true in the present Kali Yuga). Enraged, Vishvakarma curses Agastya in turn that his most favourite language (Tamil) would be tarnished in the future. Agastya, feeling guilty regarding his actions, is offered a divine vision of Vishnu, who promises him that Tamil would regain its prestige, and that a Tamil Veda would emerge.

After the Kurukshetra war, the decline of Dvaraka, and Krishna's death at the hands of the hunter Jara, Krishna, as Vishnu resumes his residence at his abode in Vaikuntha, sowing the seeds of the Kali Yuga. He becomes worried about the people of the Kali Yuga. His attributes, such as the Sudarshana Chakra and the Panchajanya, enquire the reason for his anxiety, and he confides his fears to them. The Sudarshana Chakra suggests that he slice the head of all the people who refuse dharma, to which Vishnu smiles and refuses. Vishnu decides that his amshas (parts of his identity) would be incarnated as humans on earth, and teach them the path of righteousness and devotion to him. These amshas happily accepted their birth as the twelve Alvars, aligning with the boon given to Agastya, and also became a role model for the human beings who came later in the Kali Yuga.

Fulfilling the promise that Vishnu made to Agastya, Nammalvar (Regarded to be an incarnation of Vishvaksena) is credited for converting the Rigveda to 100 poems called the Tiruviruttam, the Yajurveda as Thiruvarshiyam, and the Sama Veda as Tiruvaymoli in 1000 verses (poems).

Varnas 

The saints had different origins and belonged to different varnas. As per tradition, the first three Alvars, Poigai Alvar, Bhuthath Alvar, Peyalvar and Andal were born miraculously i.e., they were not given birth. Thirumalisai Alvar was the son of a sage Bhargava; Thondaradipodi Alvar, Mathurakavi Alvar, Perialvar were Brahmin; Kulasekhara was a Kshatriya, Nammalvar was from a cultivator family, Thirupanalvar from Tamil Panar community and Thirumangai Alvar from kalvar community. Some Vaishnavities consider only the main 10 Alvars (except Andal and Madhurakavi Alvar) while other include these two in the list too. Srirangam is the only Divya Desam that was glorified commonly by the 12 Alvars.

Works 
Temple records and inscriptions give a detailed account of the Alvars and their works. According to these texts, the saints were considered incarnations of some form of Vishnu. Few of them are:

 Divya Suri Saritra by Garuda-Vahana Pandita (11th century) 
 Guruparamparaprabavam by Pinbaragiya Perumal Jiyar 
 Periya tiru mudi adaivu by Anbillai Kandadiappan 
 Yatindra Pranava Prabavam by Pillai Lokam Jiyar
 commentaries on Divya Prabandam 
 Guru Parampara (lineage of Gurus) texts

Dating 
According to traditional account by Manavala Mamunigal, the first three Alvars namely Poigai Alvar, Bhoothath Alvar and Pey Alvar belong to Dvapara Yuga (even before the birth of Krishna, i.e., before 4200 BCE). It is widely accepted by tradition and historians that the trio are the earliest among the twelve Alvars. Along with the three Saiva Nayanmars, they influenced the ruling Pallava kings, creating a Bhakti movement that resulted in changing the religious geography from Buddhism and Jainism to these two sects of Hinduism in the region (even though Buddhism did not exist until 5th century BCE). 

After the era of Alvars, few of the Divya Prabandham were lost. In order to retrieve them, Vishnu is believed to have sent Nathamuni, who had a vision of Nammalvar through the idol that Nammalvar advised Madhurakavi Alvar to obtain. The idol can be found today in the Alvarthirunagari Temple.

Summary

Some modern scholars suggest that they lived during 5th – 9th century CE, "on the basis of a few historical evidences", although no "clear" evidence exists to place them between the 5th to the 9th century CE. The Encyclopædia Britannica says that Alvars lived between 7th and 10th centuries CE. Professor of Religion and Asian Studies, James G. Lochtefeld of Carthage College, notes in his The Illustrated Encyclopedia of Hinduism, the first three Alvars Poigai, Bhoothath and Pey belonged to the 7th century; while Nammalvar and Madhurakavi belonged to the 10th century; while the rest of them lived in the 9th century.

Traditionally the Alvars are considered to have lived between 4200 BCE and 2700 BCE, while some texts account for range between 4200 BCE and early 10th century. Traditional dates take them to the age of Shuka from the period of the Bhagavata Purana, the first four (Poigai Alvar, Bhoothathalvar, Peyalvar and Thirumalisai Alvar) are from Dvapara Yuga, while Nammalwar, Madhurakavi Alvar and others belong to Kali Yuga.

The following table shows the place, century and star of birth of each Alvar. Scholarly dating, except that of Kulasekhara Alvar, is based on summary of views of modern scholars by Dr. N Subba Reddiar, although even these dates lack historical evidence. Much effort has gone into dating Kulasekhara Alvar recently. The Alvar is now tentatively identified as Sthanu Ravi Kulasekhara (reigned c. 844/45–870/71 CE), the first known ruler of the medieval Cheras kings of Kerala.

See also
 Bhakti movement
 Tamil mythology
 Nathamuni

Notes

References

Bibliography
 
 Hymns for the Drowning by A.K. Ramanujan (Penguin)
 Nammalvar by A. Srinivasa Raghavan (Sahitya Akademi, New Delhi),1975, 
 Alwargal - ^Or Eliya Arimugam by Sujatha (Visa Publications, Chennai, India)(in Tamil), 2001

External links

 The Alvar Saints (ramanuja.org)
 The Alvar Saints of Tamilnadu by Jyotsna Kamat

 
Indian philosophy
Bhakti movement
Tamil Hindu saints